Per Johnsson (born April 20, 1988) is a Swedish professional ice hockey player who is currently playing with Sunne IK in the Hockeytvåan (Div.3). He was drafted by the Calgary Flames in the 2006 NHL Entry Draft as the 209th pick overall.

Playing career
Johnsson played as a youth within Färjestad BK before making his professional and senior debut during the 2006–07 season. His father, Per-Erik Johnsson, was the coach of Färjestad BK when he made his debut, finishing with 1 point in 11 games.

Unsigned from the Calgary Flames, Johnsson also played in the Finnish SM-liiga with HC TPS.

External links

1988 births
Living people
Bofors IK players
Calgary Flames draft picks
EfB Ishockey players
Färjestad BK players
Malmö Redhawks players
Örebro HK players
Swedish ice hockey forwards
HC TPS players
IF Troja/Ljungby players
Sportspeople from Karlstad